Beta Pyxidis, Latinized from β Pyxidis, is a double star located in the southern constellation Pyxis. It has an apparent visual magnitude of 3.954, making it the second brightest star in that faint constellation. Based upon parallax measurements, the star is an estimated 420 light-years (128 parsecs) from the Earth.

The spectrum matches a bright giant or giant star of stellar classification G7II-III.G7II/III It has 1.2 times the mass of the Sun but has expanded to 24 times the Sun's radius. The effective temperature of the star's outer envelope is about 5,124 K,  giving it the characteristic yellow hue of a G-type star. Beta Pyxidis has an unusually high rate of spin for an evolved star of this type, showing a projected rotational velocity of 11.8 km/s. One possible explanation is that it may have engulfed a nearby giant planet, such as a hot Jupiter.

In 2010, the star was among a survey of massive, lower effective temperature supergiants in an attempt to detect a magnetic field. This star may have a longitudinal magnetic field with a strength of less than a Gauss. It is a young disk star system with space velocity components,  = . There is a magnitude 12.5 optical companion, located at an angular separation of 12.7 arcseconds and a position angle of 118° as of the year 1943.

Naming

References

G-type bright giants
Pyxis (constellation)
Pyxidis, Beta
Durchmusterung objects
074006
042515
3438